Metro Ice Arena was a 4,600-capacity, 34,000 square foot indoor arena located in Lansing, Michigan.  It hosted the International Hockey League's Lansing Lancers in the 1974–75 season. The venue was converted to a movie theater in the early 1980s.

Types of Events Held  
Metro Ice Arena held a number of events during its time open, including rock concerts, public skating, hockey leagues, professional wrestling, and similar activities.

As of 2019, an investment group purchased the property and has plans to host the Lansing City Futstal franchise and planned to turn the arena into a "one-stop destination for sports and entertainment."

References

Indoor ice hockey venues in Michigan
Defunct indoor arenas in the United States
Defunct sports venues in Michigan
Sports venues in Lansing, Michigan
Indoor arenas in Michigan
1980s disestablishments in Michigan